is a Japanese actor who is represented by the talent agencies Shōnen Shachu and Ace Agent.

Biography
Taira went to Toho Koto Gakko in Nagoya, Aichi Prefecture, and was later a member of the Waseda University Theatre Research Society (also known as Gekken). He founded the troupe Shōnen Shachu with Nobuhiro Mori. He was also later affiliated with Ace Agent.

Filmography

TV series

Films

References

External links
 Official profile at Shōnen Shachu 
 Official profile at Ace Agent 

Japanese male actors
1975 births
Living people
Actors from Aichi Prefecture